is one of 24 wards of Osaka, Japan.

External links

Official website of Miyakojima 

Wards of Osaka